Anne Jacqueline Hathaway (born November 12, 1982) is an American actress. The recipient of various accolades, including an Academy Award, a Golden Globe Award, and a Primetime Emmy Award, she was among the world's highest-paid actresses in 2015. Her films have grossed over $6.8 billion worldwide, and she appeared on the Forbes Celebrity 100 list in 2009.

Hathaway performed in several plays in high school. As a teenager, she was cast in the television series Get Real (1999–2000) and made her breakthrough by playing the lead role in the Disney comedy The Princess Diaries (2001). After starring in a string of family films, including Ella Enchanted (2004), Hathaway made a transition to adult roles with the 2005 drama Brokeback Mountain. The comedy-drama The Devil Wears Prada (2006), in which she played an assistant to a fashion magazine editor, was her biggest commercial success to that point. She played a recovering addict in the drama Rachel Getting Married (2008), which earned her a nomination for the Academy Award for Best Actress.

Hathaway went on to star in several commercially successful films, including the comedy Get Smart (2008), the romances Bride Wars (2009), Valentine's Day (2010), and Love & Other Drugs (2010), and the fantasy film Alice in Wonderland (2010). In 2012, she starred as Catwoman in her highest-grossing film, The Dark Knight Rises, and played Fantine, a prostitute dying of tuberculosis, in the musical Les Misérables, winning the Academy Award for Best Supporting Actress. She has since played a scientist in the science fiction film Interstellar (2014), the owner of an online fashion site in the comedy The Intern (2015), a haughty actress in the heist film Ocean's 8 (2018), a con artist in the comedy The Hustle (2019), and Rebekah Neumann in the miniseries WeCrashed (2022).

Hathaway has won a Primetime Emmy Award for her voice role in the sitcom The Simpsons, sung for soundtracks, appeared on stage, and hosted events. She supports several charitable causes. She is a board member of the Lollipop Theatre Network, an organization that brings films to children in hospitals, and advocates for gender equality as a UN Women goodwill ambassador. Hathaway  is married to actor and businessman Adam Shulman and has two sons with him.

Early life and background
Anne Jacqueline "Annie" Hathaway was born on November 12, 1982, in the Brooklyn borough of New York City. Her father, Gerald, is a labor attorney, and her mother, Kate (née McCauley), is a former actress. Hathaway's maternal grandfather was WIP (AM) Philadelphia radio personality Joe McCauley. Her mother is of Irish descent, and her father has Irish, French, English, and German ancestry. Hathaway was named after Shakespeare's wife. She has an older brother, Michael, and a younger brother, Thomas. When Hathaway was six, the family moved to Millburn, New Jersey, where she was raised.

At age eight, when Hathaway watched her mother perform in the first national tour of Les Misérables as Fantine, she instantly became fascinated with the stage, but her parents were not keen on allowing her to pursue an acting career. After this, Kate quit acting to raise Hathaway and her brothers. Hathaway was raised as Roman Catholic with what she considers to be "really strong values" and wished to be a nun during her childhood, but acting was always a high priority for her. Her relationship with the Catholic Church changed at age fifteen, after learning that her older brother was gay. Her family left the church, converting to Episcopalianism because of its acceptance of homosexuality, but eventually left that too. In 2009, Hathaway described her religious beliefs as "a work in progress".

Hathaway attended Brooklyn Heights Montessori School and Wyoming Elementary School in Millburn. She graduated from Millburn High School, where she played soccer and took part in many plays, including Once Upon a Mattress, in which she portrayed Winnifred. Later, she appeared in other plays like Jane Eyre and Gigi, at New Jersey's Paper Mill Playhouse. She studied at the American Academy of Dramatic Arts in 1993 and became the first teenager admitted into the Barrow Group Theater Company's acting program. She spent several semesters studying as an English major and political science minor at Vassar College in Poughkeepsie, New York, before transferring to New York University's Gallatin School of Individualized Study.

Between 1998 and 1999, Hathaway sang soprano with the All-Eastern U.S. High School Honors Chorus at Carnegie Hall and in plays at Seton Hall Preparatory School in West Orange, New Jersey. At the start of her film career, her acting style and appearance were compared to Judy Garland—whom she cites as one of her favorite actresses—and Audrey Hepburn. Three days after her performance at Carnegie Hall, Hathaway was cast in the short-lived Fox television series Get Real. She played the teenager Meghan Green alongside Jon Tenney, Debrah Farentino and Jesse Eisenberg. Despite her early success, Hathaway suffered from depression and anxiety as a teenager; she said in 2008 she had since grown from it. She missed her first college semester for the filming of her cinematic debut The Princess Diaries (2001). Hathaway says she never regretted not completing her degree, as she enjoyed being with others who "were trying to grow up".

Career

2001–2004: Early roles and breakthrough
The comedy The Princess Diaries and the adventure drama The Other Side of Heaven, both 2001 Disney films, featured Hathaway in lead roles. Based on Meg Cabot's 2000 novel of the same name, the former follows teenage Mia Thermopolis (Hathaway) who discovers that she is the heiress to the throne of the fictional Kingdom of Genovia. Hathaway auditioned for the role during a flight layover on the way to New Zealand. Garry Marshall, the film's director, initially considered Liv Tyler for the role, but cast Hathaway after his granddaughters suggested that she had the best "princess" hair. The film became a major commercial success, grossing $165 million worldwide. Many critics praised Hathaway's performance; a BBC critic noted that "Hathaway shines in the title role and generates great chemistry" and The New York Times Elvis Mitchell found her to be "royalty in the making, a young comic talent with a scramble of features". She earned an MTV Movie Award for Best Breakthrough Female Performance nomination for the role. Hathaway starred with Christopher Gorham in Mitch Davis's The Other Side of Heaven. Inspired by John H. Groberg's memoir In the Eye of the Storm, the film met with mostly negative reviews and was a box-office failure.

Owing to the success of The Princess Diaries, People magazine named Hathaway one of its breakthrough stars of 2001. In February 2002, Hathaway starred in the City Center Encores! concert production of Carnival! in her New York City stage debut. She played Lili, an optimistic orphan who falls in love with a magician. Before rehearsing with the full cast, Hathaway trained with a vocal coach for two weeks. She memorized almost all her lines and songs at the first read-through. Critics generally praised her for holding her own against well-known actors and heralded her as a new star. In a positive review for the musical, Charles Isherwood of Variety called Hathaway the highlight of the show and "remarkably unaffected and winning", praising her convincing performance. She won a Clarence Derwent Award for Most Promising Female. Later, Hathaway voiced the audiobook release of the first three books in The Princess Diaries novels.

Hathaway portrayed princesses and appeared in family-oriented films over the next three years, subsequently becoming known in mainstream media as a children's role model. After voicing Haru Yoshioka for the English version of The Cat Returns (2002), she starred in Douglas McGrath's comedy-drama Nicholas Nickleby (2002), which opened to positive reviews. However, the film did not enter wide release and failed at the North American box office, totaling less than $4 million in ticket sales. The fantasy romantic comedy film Ella Enchanted (2004), in which Hathaway played the titular character, also performed poorly at the box office. She had first read the book on which the film is based when she was 16, and stated that the script was originally much closer to the book but did not work as a film, and therefore prefers the film the way it became. The film opened to mostly mixed reviews. Hathaway sang three songs on the film's soundtrack, including a duet with singer Jesse McCartney.

In 2003, Hathaway turned down the role of Christine Daaé for Joel Schumacher's The Phantom of the Opera (2004), because the production schedule of the film overlapped with The Princess Diaries 2: Royal Engagement (2004). She was initially hesitant and nervous about starring in the sequel, but agreed to it after Marshall convinced her that she was not repeating anything. The film was released in August 2004 to negative reviews, but made $95.1 million against a $40 million budget.

2005–2008: Transition to adult roles and critical recognition
In a 2008 article, Hathaway stated that "anybody who was a role model for children needs a reprieve", but noted that "it's lovely to think that my audience is growing up with me". To avoid typecasting, she began taking on adult roles. After replacing Tara Strong for the voice role of Red Puckett in Hoodwinked! (2005), she starred in the drama Havoc (2005) as a spoiled socialite, appearing nude in some of its scenes. Although the film was thematically different from her previous releases, Hathaway denied that her role was an attempt to be seen as a more mature actress, citing her belief that doing nudity in certain films is merely a part of what her chosen form of art demands of her; because of that belief she does not consider appearing nude in appropriate films to be morally objectionable. The film was not released in theaters in the United States due to unfavorable critical reception.

Hathaway starred opposite Heath Ledger and Jake Gyllenhaal in Ang Lee's drama Brokeback Mountain (2005). The film depicts the emotional and sexual relationship between two men married to women, Ennis (Ledger) and Jack (Gyllenhaal); she played Jack's wife, Lureen. Hathaway was originally sent the script with the role of Alma, Ennis' wife, but decided to audition for Lureen once she read the screenplay. During her audition, she lied to Lee about her knowledge of horseback riding so he would cast her, but she did subsequently take lessons. The film received critical acclaim and several Academy Award nominations. Peter Travers of Rolling Stone believed that Hathaway "excels at showing Lureen's journey from cutie-pie to hard case", and Todd McCarthy of Variety wrote that she "provides an entertaining contrast in wifely disappointment". Hathaway later stated that the content of the film was more important than its award count, and that making it made her more aware of the kind of stories she wanted to tell as an actor. At this point, she realized that she wanted to play roles to move audiences or otherwise entertain them so much that they forget about their own lives.

In 2006, Hathaway starred in David Frankel's comedy-drama The Devil Wears Prada, based on the novel of the same name by Lauren Weisberger. The film featured her as a college graduate who lands a job as co-assistant to the powerful fashion magazine editor Miranda Priestly (played by Meryl Streep). Hathaway was "the ninth choice" for the role, citing this later as an inspiration for people to never give up. To prepare for the part, she volunteered for a few weeks as an assistant at an auction house. She said working on the film made her respect the fashion industry a great deal more than she did previously, though she admitted that her personal style was something she "still can't get right". She and co-star Emily Blunt got so hungry on their weight-loss regimen for the film it made them cry. The Devil Wears Prada received positive reviews; Roger Ebert called Hathaway "a great beauty [...] who makes a convincing career girl" and Rotten Tomatoes found "Streep in top form and Anne Hathaway more than holding her own". The film became her biggest commercial success to that point, grossing more than $326.5 million worldwide.

Hathaway was cast in Knocked Up, but dropped out before filming began and was replaced by Katherine Heigl. According to writer-director Judd Apatow, this happened because Hathaway was uncomfortable with the use of real footage of a woman giving birth; she believed it did not contribute to the film's story. Her sole release of 2007 was the biographical romantic drama Becoming Jane, as the titular English author Jane Austen. A fan of Austen since she was 14, Hathaway prepared for the role by rereading Austen's books and conducting historical research, such as perusing the author's letters; she also learned sign language, calligraphy, dance choreography, and the piano. She moved to England a month before filming began to improve her English accent. She received a British Independent Film Award for Best Actress nomination for the film, although some critics negatively focused on her accent and performance.

In October 2008, Hathaway hosted an episode of the NBC late-night sketch comedy Saturday Night Live. She also starred in Peter Segal's film adaptation of Mel Brooks' television series Get Smart, in which she played Agent 99. Considering the role to be "a childhood dream come true", Hathaway learned martial arts and dancing techniques in preparation. While filming an action sequence, she split the flesh of her shin to the bone, which led to her receiving 15 stitches. The film, centering on an analyst who dreams of becoming a real field agent and a better spy, was a financial success. Her following release, the mystery thriller Passengers alongside Patrick Wilson, was a critical and commercial failure. Hathaway then starred in Jonathan Demme's drama Rachel Getting Married as Kym, a young woman who, after being released from drug rehabilitation, returns home for her sister's wedding. She described her character as "narcissistic—downright selfish". Rachel Getting Married premiered at the 2008 Venice and Toronto International Film Festivals, and Hathaway was widely acclaimed for her performance. Peter Travers found her to be "raw and riveting" in the role, adding that she "acts the hell out of it, achieving a state of sorrowful grace". She received Academy Award and Golden Globe Award nominations for Best Actress.

2009–2011: Romantic comedies and hosting events
Hathaway starred in Bride Wars (2009), which she described as "hideously commercial—gloriously so". The romantic comedy, in which she and Kate Hudson played two best friends who become rivals after their weddings are scheduled on the same day, was a critical failure; it was named among the ten worst chick flicks in history by Time in 2010. Despite this, the film was successful financially and earned Hathaway an MTV Movie Award for Best Female Performance nomination. She played the heroine Viola in a summer 2009 production of Twelfth Night at the Delacorte Theater in New York City. Charles Isherwood opined that Hathaway "dives smoothly and with obvious pleasure into the embrace of a cohesive ensemble cast". For her portrayal of the role, she garnered a nomination for the Drama Desk Award for Outstanding Actress in a Play. In 2010, she also won a Primetime Emmy Award for Outstanding Voice-Over Performance for providing her voice for the episode "Once Upon a Time in Springfield" in The Simpsons. Hathaway voiced different characters in Family Guy in 2010 and 2011.

In 2010, Hathaway appeared as a receptionist who dates a clerk (played by Topher Grace) in the ensemble romantic comedy Valentine's Day, directed by Garry Marshall. The film was a commercial success, grossing more than $215 million worldwide against a budget of $52 million. Hathaway played the White Queen in Tim Burton's 2010 adaptation of the fantasy novels Alice's Adventures in Wonderland and Through the Looking-Glass alongside Helena Bonham Carter and Johnny Depp. She summed up her character with a caption on a magnet of Happy Bunny holding a knife; "Cute but psycho. Things even out." Hathaway described her interpretation of the White Queen as "a punk-rock vegan pacifist", drawing inspiration from Debbie Harry and the artwork of Dan Flavin. Alice in Wonderland received mixed reviews from critics, who praised the film's visuals but criticized the lack of narrative coherence. Commercially, it grossed $1 billion to become the second-highest-grossing film of 2010.

Hathaway reunited with Jake Gyllenhaal as a free-spirited artist with Parkinson's disease in Edward Zwick's erotic romantic comedy-drama Love & Other Drugs, based on the nonfiction book Hard Sell: The Evolution of a Viagra Salesman by Jamie Reidy. For the role, she spent time with a Parkinson's patient to research the disease, and in preparation for the film's nude scenes, she watched films of Kate Winslet and Penélope Cruz who, in Hathaway's view, have done nudity with sensitivity and dignity. She believed these scenes would not discourage socially conservative people from watching the film. Critics generally praised the film's adult romance, but were unenthusiastic about its plot elements. Hathaway's performance, which Ebert called "warm, lovable", earned her a Satellite Award and a nomination for the Golden Globe Award for Best Actress – Comedy or Musical. Together with actor Denzel Washington, Hathaway hosted the Nobel Peace Prize Concert in Oslo, Norway in December 2010. Two months later, she and James Franco hosted the 83rd Academy Awards. Critics were unenthusiastic about their chemistry, but thought Hathaway gave her best and did a better job than Franco, who they felt seemed uninterested. At the 63rd Primetime Emmy Awards, she garnered an Outstanding Variety Special (Live) nomination.

In 2011, Hathaway voiced Jewel, a female Spix's macaw from Rio de Janeiro, in the animated film Rio, produced by 20th Century Fox and Blue Sky Studios. The film received generally positive reviews from film critics, who praised the visuals, voice acting and music. A commercial success, it grossed more than $484 million worldwide against a budget of $90 million. Later, Hathaway starred alongside Jim Sturgess in Lone Scherfig's One Day, based on David Nicholls' 2009 novel of the same name. The film tells the story of two young people who meet twenty years after they shared a one-night stand together. Hathaway was clandestinely given the script, as One Day was set in Britain, and Scherfig was not looking for any American actresses for the part. After a nonproductive meeting with Scherfig, Hathaway left a list of songs for the director, who after listening to them, cast the actress for the part. Hathaway later expressed regret that she might have inadvertently encouraged misogyny as she did not trust Scherfig as a director, which she felt was because of her gender. Hathaway's Yorkshire accent in the film was considered subpar. Columnist Suzanne Moore, reviewing the film on BBC Radio 4's Front Row, said Hathaway's accents were "all over the shop", adding, "Sometimes she's from Scotland, sometimes she's from New York, you just can't tell". The film itself received polarizing reviews from critics, but became a moderate box office success.

2012–2014: Les Misérables and films with Christopher Nolan
In 2012, Hathaway's audiobook recording of L. Frank Baum's 1900 novel The Wonderful Wizard of Oz was released at Audible.com and garnered her an Audie Award nomination for Best Solo Narration – Female. She then played the sly, morally ambiguous cat burglar Selina Kyle / Catwoman in The Dark Knight Rises, the final installment in Christopher Nolan's The Dark Knight trilogy. Hathaway auditioned not knowing what part she was being considered for, admitting that she had one character in mind but only learned her role after talking with Nolan for an hour. She described it as her most physically demanding assignment to that point, as she had to redouble her efforts in the gym to keep up with the requirements of the role. She trained extensively in martial arts, and looked to Hedy Lamarr in developing her Catwoman portrayal. The Dark Knight Rises was critically successful and grossed more than $1 billion worldwide, becoming the third-highest-grossing film of 2012. IGN critic Jim Vejvoda wrote of Hathaway's "magnetic presence", adding that she "imbues her [character] with a wounded spirit and a survivor's edge that makes her feel genuine and sympathetic". She won the Saturn Award for Best Supporting Actress for her performance.

Hathaway portrayed Fantine, a prostitute dying of tuberculosis, in Tom Hooper's Les Misérables, a film adaptation of the stage musical of the same name. Footage of the actress singing "I Dreamed a Dream", a song from the film, was shown at the 2012 CinemaCon, where Hooper described her singing as "raw" and "real". In preparation for the role, Hathaway consumed fewer than 500 calories a day to lose , researched prostitution, and cut her hair. To get into her character's mental space alone during filming in London, she sent her husband back to the United States; this resulted in her becoming increasingly temperamental. Ann Hornaday of The Washington Post asserted that "the centerpiece of a movie composed entirely of centerpieces belongs to Anne Hathaway, who as the tragic heroine Fantine sings another of the memorable numbers". She won the Academy Award, Golden Globe, Screen Actors Guild and BAFTA Award for Best Supporting Actress. Asked if she was pleased with her performance in the film, Hathaway expressed doubts, replying with "Eh". In January 2013, Hathaway's rendition of "I Dreamed a Dream" reached number 69 on the Billboard Hot 100.

After briefly appearing in the romantic comedy Don Jon (2013), Hathaway starred in and co-produced (with her husband and others) Song One. In the drama film, she played an anthropology student who returns home to see her injured brother, Henry (played by Ben Rosenfield), and soon begins a romantic relationship with his favorite musician, James Forester (played by Johnny Flynn). Her character was originally written as a 19-year-old, but Kate Barker-Froyland, the film's writer and director, changed the part to that of an older woman after casting Hathaway. The actress said the reason she decided to produce the film was because of its depiction of the healing power of music and second chances. For the film's soundtrack, she provided her voice for the song "Afraid of Heights". Song One premiered in the U.S. Dramatic Competition at the 30th Sundance Film Festival in January 2014, and released in theaters the following year to mixed reviews from critics. Commercially, the film failed to recoup its $6 million investment.

Hathaway reprised her role as Jewel in the animated film Rio 2—her third film with Jamie Foxx—which was released in 2014. It grossed nearly five times more than its $103 million budget. Her sole live-action release of 2014 was Christopher Nolan's epic science fiction film Interstellar. Set in a dystopian future where humanity is struggling to survive, the film follows a group of astronauts who travel through a wormhole in search of a new home for mankind. Hathaway played Dr. Amelia Brand, a NASA scientist among the astronauts. With a budget of $165 million, the high-profile production, co-starring Matthew McConaughey and Jessica Chastain, was filmed mostly using IMAX cameras. Hathaway was drawn to her character's growth from an arrogant to a humbler person. She nearly had hypothermia while filming a water scene in Iceland, because the dry suit she was wearing had not been properly secured. Reviewers for The Independent and Empire, respectively, found her to be "affecting" in her role as a scientist unable to decide between her professional responsibilities and her feelings, and credited her for playing the part with "soulful nuance". Interstellar grossed over $701 million worldwide, and earned Hathaway a nomination for the Saturn Award for Best Actress.

2015–2021: Comedic roles and career fluctuations
Hathaway began 2015 with an appearance in the first season of the musical reality show Lip Sync Battle. In the episode, she competed against her The Devil Wears Prada co-star Emily Blunt; she lip synced "Love" by Mary J. Blige and "Wrecking Ball" by Miley Cyrus. Nancy Meyers' The Intern was Hathaway's sole film release of 2015. It tells the story of Ben Whittaker (played by Robert De Niro), a 70-year-old widower who becomes a senior intern at an online fashion site run by Jules Ostin (Hathaway). She had aspired to work with De Niro and Meyers, her favorite actor and director, respectively; impressed with the film's story, she auditioned for the third time for a Meyers film. Reviews of the film were generally positive; one in Roger Ebert's website found her to be "extremely appealing" and a reviewer for New York magazine wrote, "The Intern gets off on De Niro's amiability and Hathaway's sweet energy". The film grossed $194 million worldwide against a $35 million budget. The 2015 found footage horror film Be My Cat: A Film for Anne, about an aspiring Romanian filmmaker who goes to shocking extremes to convince Hathaway to star in his film, was officially selected and had its North American premiere at the 2016 Nashville Film Festival.

Hathaway reprised the role of the White Queen in Alice Through the Looking Glass, the 2016 sequel to Alice in Wonderland. That March, it was reported that she would reprise her role for The Princess Diaries 3; the project was shelved after the death of Garry Marshall, who was set to direct the film. Hathaway is one of several actors featured on Barbra Streisand's 2016 album Encore: Movie Partners Sing Broadway. Along with Daisy Ridley, Hathaway and Streisand performed the song "At The Ballet" from A Chorus Line; she played the role of Maggie, one of a trio of dancers hoping to be cast in an upcoming show. Her final film that year was alongside Jason Sudeikis in Nacho Vigalondo's science fiction black comedy Colossal (2016). Playing an unemployed young writer, Hathaway was the first actress to sign on at a time when the project had no financial backing. She was drawn to the genre-hopping nature of the script, later comparing it to Being John Malkovich (1999), one of her favorite films. The film received positive reviews from critics, but earned only $4 million at the box office.

After a two-year absence from the screen, Hathaway starred as a famous actress in the all-female spin-off of the Ocean's Eleven franchise, Ocean's 8, directed by Gary Ross. Co-starring Sandra Bullock and Cate Blanchett, the film follows a group of criminals who plan to rob the Met Gala. Hathaway found it fun playing someone with an immense ego and saw the role as an opportunity "to lean into all the ridiculous fame nonsense that I've been trying to side-step for all of these years." She hoped that the film would be profitable so that it could debunk claims that female-led films do not succeed commercially. Critics felt that Hathaway "steals the show"; ABC Online's Jason Di Rosso added, "The film's best moments belong to Hathaway as the anxiety-ridden, vain and capricious starlet. She's the only successful meld of comedy and pathos—a victim of the celebrity treadmill who is also capable of outsmarting it." Ocean's 8 was a box office success, grossing over $297 million worldwide against a $70 million budget.

Hathaway's first two films of 2019—the thriller Serenity and the comedy The Hustle—were poorly received by critics. In the former, she starred alongside her Interstellar costar Matthew McConaughey as a woman who tasks her ex-husband to kill her new abusive husband, a role for which she dyed her hair blonde. The Washington Post dismissed her performance as "cartoonish", adding that her femme fatale character was reminiscent of "a kind of live-action Jessica Rabbit". The latter film was a remake of the 1988 film Dirty Rotten Scoundrels, co-starring Rebel Wilson, which emerged as a sleeper hit. Hathaway next played a woman with bipolar disorder in an episode of the Amazon Prime Video romantic anthology series Modern Love. She then played the wife of Mark Ruffalo's character in Todd Haynes' legal drama Dark Waters, about environmental poisoning committed by the chemical company DuPont. Writing for Variety, Owen Gleiberman termed her supporting performance "a piercing dance of agony and loyalty".

Hathaway began the new decade with the political thriller The Last Thing He Wanted (2020), based on the book of the same name by Joan Didion. She considered herself to be an unlikely choice for the part of a headstrong journalist, as it differed from her own "puppy dog" personality. It received negative reviews from critics. She then starred in The Witches, an adaptation of the novel of the same name from director Robert Zemeckis, in which she played an evil witch. The film received mixed reviews from critics, who deemed it inferior to the 1990 adaptation. Hathaway's performances in both films earned her nominations for Worst Actress at the 41st Golden Raspberry Awards. In 2021, she starred in the heist film Locked Down, directed by Doug Liman, which premiered on HBO Max. Set during the COVID-19 pandemic, it co-starred Chiwetel Ejiofor. The film was shot over the course of 18 days with limited resources. She next took on a role in one episode of the Amazon Prime Video anthology series Solos.

2022–present: Critical resurgence
Hathaway starred opposite Jared Leto in the Apple TV+ miniseries WeCrashed, about the company WeWork; she was also executive producer of the series. It received favorable reviews, with particular praise for Hathaway's portrayal of Rebekah Neumann. Angie Han of The Hollywood Reporter commended her for resisting "the temptation to turn Rebekah into an exaggerated caricature of an entitled woo-woo type, which ultimately only makes Rebekah funnier". Hathaway starred in James Gray's semi-autobiographical period drama Armageddon Time, portraying a character inspired by Gray's mother. David Rooney of The Hollywood Reporter considered it her best performance since Rachel Getting Married, while Owen Gleiberman of Variety praised Hathaway for making her character "at once affectionate and blinkered".

The 2023 Sundance Film Festival marked the release of Eileen, a thriller based on Ottessa Moshfegh's novel of the same name, starring Hathaway and Thomasin McKenzie. Hathaway was cast as a glamorous criminal psychologist, and she described the project as "Carol meets Reservoir Dogs". Terming the film a "perverse folie à deux", Ryan Lattanzio of IndieWire believed that "Hathaway has never been better in a role that feels [...] tailor-made for her".

Hathaway will next star in Rebecca Miller's romantic comedy She Came to Me alongside an ensemble cast. She will also team with Jessica Chastain for the psychological thriller Mothers' Instinct, which will serve as a remake of the 2018 Belgian film of the same name.

Public image

Describing Hathaway's off-screen persona, John Hiscock of The Daily Telegraph wrote in 2014 that she is a "well-grounded, friendly young woman with a good sense of humour, a wide smile and an easy-going attitude". John opined that, despite considerable success, she has never "gone Hollywood", staying close to her friends. The authors of the book 365 Style noted Hathaway's girl next door image, and her The Intern director Nancy Meyers says she is "wise beyond her years". The journalist Laura Brown found her to be a "sincere", "warm and funny" woman. After her awards acceptance speeches for Les Misérables, The Atlantic noted that several media commentators accused her of being "annoying" and making "awkward" jokes. Discussing that, Hathaway said in 2014 that she felt anxious when public speaking but has since grown from it and become a more compassionate person. Regarding her perceived image, she says, "People have this idea of me as just being a very prim, professional girl, which I suppose I am, but I do cut loose and have fun in my life".

Remarking upon her performance in Twelfth Night, Charles Isherwood wrote, "on screen or onstage Ms. Hathaway possesses the unmistakable glow of a natural star". An Esquire writer wrote that many of her good performances have been overlooked, describing her career as "subtle brilliance that has largely gone unnoticed". Discussing her career in 2015, Hathaway said that after her breakthrough in The Princess Diaries, she struggled to find serious roles or ones that were not about princesses. According to Judi Gugliemli of People, Hathaway used that fear of being typecast as motivation to build a versatile body of work. Gugliemli believed that her ability to extensively research her roles is the key to her success. A writer for The Daily Telegraph commended her willingness to appear in different genres, ranging from action comedies to dramas. Hathaway aspires to appear in many different films, work with different directors and play diverse roles. She said she would be "lost" without acting and feels lucky to have found it as her profession. A trained stage actress, she prefers performing on stage to film roles and claims to be terrified of acting on camera. "I always assume that every film is my last, and I always assume that I have to go out and convince everybody why they have to hire me. I still audition," she said.

Forbes reported that Hathaway was one of the world's highest-paid actresses in 2015, and since 2017, she has been among the highest-grossing actresses of the 21st century. In 2009, she was included on Forbes annual Celebrity 100 list with earnings of $7 million, and was invited to join the Academy of Motion Picture Arts and Sciences. , her films have grossed $6.7 billion worldwide. Profiled as among the world's leading actresses by Vanity Fair, Hathaway, according to Catherine Elsworth of The Daily Telegraph, is pursued both by directors and by cosmetics companies. In January 2008, she joined French luxury perfumes and cosmetics house Lancôme as the face of their fragrance "Magnifique". In 2011, she became the new face of the Italian company Tod's.

Hathaway's beauty and sex appeal have been picked up by several media outlets; FHM, People, Maxim, Empire and Entertainment Weekly have included her on their yearly listings of sexiest women. In 2011, Los Angeles Times Magazine listed her as one of the 50 Most Beautiful Women in Film. Elsworth called her in 2008 "the hottest young actress in Hollywood". Hathaway disagreed, insisting that she has a "good girl" image and no sex appeal. She has refused to undergo treatment with Botox, saying she is comfortable in her own skin.

Activism

Hathaway has served as a long-term advocate for the Nike Foundation to raise awareness against child marriage. In July 2006, she spent a week in Nicaragua to help vaccinate children against hepatitis A. She has also traveled to other countries to heed the rights of women and girls, including Kenya and Ethiopia. In 2008, she was honored at Elles Women in Hollywood tribute and won an award from the Human Rights Campaign for her philanthropy; she was also honored for her work with Step Up Women's Network in 2008. She then teamed up in 2010 with World Bank in a two-year development program The Girl Effect whose mission focuses on helping empower girls in developing and developed nations where one-third of young women are not employed and not in school. In 2013, she provided the narration for Girl Rising, a CNN documentary film, which focused on the power of female education as it followed seven girls around the world who sought to overcome obstacles and follow their dreams.

Hathaway serves on the board of the Lollipop Theatre Network and is involved with charities Creative Coalition, St. Jude Children's Research Hospital and the Human Rights Campaign. In 2016, Hathaway was appointed UN Women Goodwill ambassador based on her advocacy for gender equality. The following year, she spoke on International Women's Day in favor of paid parental leave for both men and women. To promote an increased awareness of systemic sexism in the entertainment industry, Hathaway has advocated for greater professional opportunities for women and criticized Hollywood as not being a place of equality. In 2018, she collaborated with 300 women in Hollywood to set up the Time's Up initiative to protect women from harassment and discrimination.

Personal life

In 2004, Hathaway began a romantic relationship with Italian real estate developer Raffaello Follieri. Follieri's Manhattan-based foundation focused on efforts such as providing vaccinations for children in poor countries. In June 2008, it was investigated by the IRS for failure to file required nonprofit information forms. In June 2008, Follieri was arrested on charges of defrauding investors out of millions of dollars in a scheme in which he posed as the Vatican's real-estate agent. It was reported that the FBI confiscated Hathaway's private journals from Follieri's New York City apartment as part of their ongoing investigation into Follieri's activities. Hathaway was not charged with any crime. In October 2008, after earlier pleading guilty, Follieri was sentenced to four and a half years in prison.

In early 2007, Hathaway spoke of her experiences with depression during her teens, saying that she eventually overcame the disorder without medication. In 2008, she began smoking after a stressful summer and the end of her relationship with Follieri. She has credited quitting smoking for the subsequent decline in her stress level and returned to being a vegetarian. Hathaway became a vegan in early 2012, but she quit in 2014.

Hathaway married actor and businessman Adam Shulman on September 29, 2012, in Big Sur, California, in a traditional Jewish ceremony. Their first son was born in March 2016. That year, Hathaway purchased an apartment worth $2.55 million on the Upper West Side of Manhattan, where she lives with Shulman and their son. Hathaway and Shulman sold their wedding photo and donated its profits to same-sex marriage advocacy group Freedom to Marry. They also hosted Freedom to Marry's National Engagement Party, an event which raised $500,000. In July 2019, Hathaway announced they were expecting their second child together, and opened up about her struggles with conception and infertility. Their second son was born in November 2019.

Politics 
Hathaway supports abortion rights, gun control, and immigrant rights. She has denounced Donald Trump for his administration anti-immigration polices. As a supporter of LGBT rights, she has donated money to organizations that support same-sex marriage. Hathaway has also spoken out against the issues of bullying of gay students, discrimination toward transgender children, and white supremacy.

In the 2012 United States presidential election Hathaway supported Barack Obama. In 2016, she supported Democratic candidate Hillary Clinton in the 2016 United States presidential election. In the 2020 United States presidential election she supported Democratic candidate Joe Biden over incumbent President Donald Trump.

In 2022, after the Russian invasion, she supported Ukraine and made donations to the Red Cross of Ukraine, UNICEF and Save the Children.

Acting credits and awards

Hathaway's most acclaimed and highest-grossing films, according to the online portal Box Office Mojo and the review aggregate site Rotten Tomatoes, include The Princess Diaries (2001), Brokeback Mountain (2005), The Devil Wears Prada (2006), Get Smart (2008), Rachel Getting Married (2008), Valentine's Day (2010), Alice in Wonderland (2010), Love and Other Drugs (2010), The Dark Knight Rises (2012), Les Misérables (2012), Interstellar (2014), The Intern (2015), Colossal (2016), and Ocean's 8 (2018).

Hathaway has been nominated for two Academy Awards, three Golden Globe Awards, and a British Academy Film Award. She has won an Academy Award, a Golden Globe, a Screen Actors Guild and a BAFTA Award for Best Supporting Actress for Les Misérables. She has also won a Primetime Emmy Award for Outstanding Voice-Over Performance for her voice role in a 2010 episode of The Simpsons. In November 2018, Hathaway was one of 50 nominees for the New Jersey Hall of Fame, an organization that honors contributions to society and the world beyond. In May 2019, Hathaway received a motion pictures star on the Hollywood Walk of Fame for her contributions to the film industry.

Explanatory notes

References

External links

 
 
 
 
 

1982 births
Living people
21st-century American actresses
21st-century American women singers
21st-century American singers
Actresses from New Jersey
Actresses from New York City
American feminists
American film actresses
American people of British descent
American people of English descent
American people of French descent
American people of German descent
American people of Irish descent
American stage actresses
American television actresses
American voice actresses
Audiobook narrators
Best Supporting Actress Academy Award winners
Best Supporting Actress BAFTA Award winners
Best Supporting Actress Golden Globe (film) winners
Former Anglicans
Former Roman Catholics
Method actors
Millburn High School alumni
Musicians from Brooklyn
New York University Gallatin School of Individualized Study alumni
Outstanding Performance by a Female Actor in a Supporting Role Screen Actors Guild Award winners
People from Millburn, New Jersey
People from the Upper West Side
Primetime Emmy Award winners
Vassar College alumni